Haukur Hilmarsson (22 July 1986 – 24 February 2018) was an Icelandic political activist. He played a crucial role in initiating a movement for the rights of refugees in Iceland. He rose to prominence during the 2009 Icelandic financial crisis protests after climbing to the roof of the house of the Icelandic parliament, Alþingishúsið, and hoisting the flag of the Bónus supermarket chain on the building's flagpole. His arrest two weeks later resulted in an attempt by a crowd of protesters to storm the Icelandic Police headquarters in downtown Reykjavík where Haukur was held and from where he was subsequently released.

Death
Haukur traveled to Syria in 2017 and joined an anarchist unit of the International Freedom Battalion called Revolutionary Union for Internationalist Solidarity (RUIS) alongside the YPG. He participated in the liberation of Raqqa that same year. On 6 March 2018 Turkish media reported that Haukur had been killed in a Turkish airstrike in Afrin on 24 February. As of February 2021, his body had not been retrieved.

Personal life
Haukur was the son of Icelandic activist and writer Eva Hauksdóttir.

References

1986 births
2018 deaths
Icelandic environmentalists
Icelandic anarchists
International Freedom Battalion
Military personnel killed in the Syrian civil war
People's Protection Units